Lotus ornithopodioides, the southern bird's foot trefoil, is a species of annual herb in the family Fabaceae. They have a self-supporting growth form and compound, broad leaves. Individuals can grow to 5 cm tall.

Sources

References 

ornithopodioides
Flora of Malta